George Farrell may refer to:

 George Farrell (bobsleigh) (born 1964), British bobsledder
 George Farrell (politician) (1895–1966), member of the Queensland Legislative Assembly